The Elcano Royal Institute for International and Strategic Studies (Spanish: Real Instituto Elcano de Estudios Internacionales y Estratégicos; RIE) is a think tank based in Madrid, Spain.

It was created on 26 November 2001 as private foundation, formed by the Ministries of Foreign Affairs, Economy, Defence and Education, Culture and Sport as well as the public railway company RENFE, also receiving the additional funding from PRISA, CASA, CEPSA, SEAT, Indra Sistemas, the SGAE; Telefónica and Zeltia. It was set up with the aim of "promoting in society the knowledge of the international reality and of the foreign relations of Spain in all its aspects."

Organization 
Honorary President
 Felipe VI (King of Spain, formerly Prince of Asturias)
Chairman of the Board of Trustees
 Eduardo Serra Rexach (2001–2005)
 Gustavo Suárez Pertierra (2006–2011)
  (since 2012)
Director
 Emilio Lamo de Espinosa (2001–2005)
 Gil Carlos Rodríguez Iglesias (2005–2012)
 Charles Powell (since 2012)

References 
Citations

Bibliography 
 

Foreign policy and strategy think tanks in Europe
Think tanks based in Spain
Foreign policy and strategy think tanks